Rowing at the 1952 Summer Olympics featured seven events, for men only. The competitions were held from 20 to 23 July.

Medal summary

Participating nations

A total of 404 rowers from 33 nations competed at the Helsinki Games:

Medal table

References

External links
 International Olympic Committee medal database

 
1952 Summer Olympics events
1952
Oly